Vali Asr Garrison of Hazrat Qa'im Mohammad Brigade ( – Pādegān Valī ʿAṣr Tīp ḥaz̤rat Qāym Moḥammad) is a village and military installation in Howmeh Rural District, in the Central District of Semnan County, Semnan Province, Iran. At the 2006 census, its population was 281, in 83 families.

References 

Populated places in Semnan County
Military installations of Iran